Denys Molchanov and Aleksandr Nedovyesov were the defending champions but chose not to defend their title.

Riccardo Bonadio and Giovanni Fonio won the title after defeating Hsu Yu-hsiou and Tseng Chun-hsin 3–6, 6–2, [12–10] in the final.

Seeds

Draw

References

External links
 Main draw

Antalya Challenger III - Doubles